Benjamin Ulrich (born 20 January 1988) is a German international rugby union player, playing for the RK 03 Berlin in the Rugby-Bundesliga and the German national rugby union team.

He is playing rugby since 1999.

Ulrich was part of a group of German players which were sent to South Africa in 2009 to improve their rugby skills at the  Academy as part of the Wild Rugby Academy program. He spent six months in South Africa, together with Lukas Hinds-Johnson, another player of RK 03 Berlin.

Ulrich made his debut for Germany in a friendly against Hong Kong on 12 December 2009.

Stats
Benjamin Ulrich's personal statistics in club and international rugby:

Club

 As of 30 April 2012

National team

European Nations Cup

Friendlies & other competitions

 As of 22 March 2010

References

External links
 Benjamin Ulrich at scrum.com
   Benjamin Ulrich at totalrugby.de

1988 births
Living people
German rugby union players
Germany international rugby union players
RK 03 Berlin players
Rugby union centres